Lycaneptia nigrobasalis is a species of beetle in the family Cerambycidae. It was described by Friedrich F. Tippmann in 1960. It is thought to be from Brazil.

References

Hemilophini
Beetles described in 1960